Umm Kulthum or Umme Kulsum is a female given name that means "Mother of Kulthum". Several of these were connected directly to the Islamic prophet Muhammad. It has also been used in modern times. The list below is by approximate order of notability and divided between ancient and modern times.

People in antiquity who had this name:
Umm Kulthum bint Muhammad, one of the daughters of Muhammad (died c. 630)
Umm Kulthum bint Ali, a daughter of Ali and granddaughter of Muhammad
Umm Kulthum bint Uqba, a daughter of Uqba ibn Abi Mu'ayt, a companion of Muhammad and commentator on the Qur'an
Umm Kulthum bint Abu Bakr, a daughter of Abu Bakr, a companion of Muhammad (born c. 635) and one of the Rashidun caliphes
Umm Kulthum bint Jarwal, a wife of Umar, a companion of Muhammad

People in modern times with this name:
Umm Kulthum, famous Egyptian singer (1898/1904-1975)
Umme Kulsum Smrity (born 1963), Bangladeshi politician

See also
Kulthum

See also
 Arabic name

Arabic feminine given names